Goth Bozo is a town in the Sindh province of Pakistan. It is located at 28°14'40N 69°12'0E with an altitude of 68 metres (226 feet).

References

Populated places in Sindh